Good News Kasama si Vicky Morales is a Philippine television news magazine show broadcast by GMA News TV and GTV. Hosted by Vicky Morales, it premiered on March 6, 2011.

Overview
Anchored by Vicky Morales, it features news from that focuses on the positive events in the Philippines. Bea Binene anchors segments that shows different attractions for children as well as news from the youth.

In February 2021, GMA News TV was rebranded as GTV, with the show being carried over.

Hosts
 Vicky Morales
 Bea Binene
 Love Añover
 Maey Bautista
 Jay Arcilla

Production
The production was halted in March 2020 due to the enhanced community quarantine in Luzon caused by the COVID-19 pandemic. The show resumed its programming on November 9, 2020.

Accolades

References

External links
 
 

2011 Philippine television series debuts
Filipino-language television shows
GMA Integrated News and Public Affairs shows
GMA News TV original programming
GTV (Philippine TV network) original programming
Philippine television news shows
Television productions suspended due to the COVID-19 pandemic